Stadion Septemvri is a multi-purpose stadium in Sofia, Bulgaria.  It is currently used mostly for football matches. The stadium will hold 4,500.

History

Old Septemvri Stadium
Septemvri Stadium was opened on 18 March 1958 with a friendly match against PFC Septemvri Sofia and PFC Levski Sofia. The stadium had 25,000 seats.

New Septemvri Stadium
In 2011 Hristo Stoichkov announced that a new Septemvri Stadium would be built with 15,000 seats and would have the name The Crown of Septemvri. But the project was cancelled in 2013.

After the takeover of Septemvri by DIT Group in 2015, the new owners would fund a new stadium. In the beginning of 2017 it was announced that the new Septemvri Stadium building would start in summer 2017, if the team get the promotion for the Bulgarian First League. In 2018 the project with 4,500 seats was run, expecting to be approved before the end of 2018.

References

Football venues in Bulgaria
Multi-purpose stadiums in Bulgaria
Sports venues in Sofia